Jacob Eli Gunn Glanville is an American computational immunoengineer and businessperson. He is co-founder and chief executive officer of the start-up company Distributed Bio and its spin-out, Centivax. Glanville was featured in the documentary series Pandemic: How to Prevent an Outbreak. Glanville was born in The Dalles, Oregon and raised in Guatemala to American expatriate parents. His mother is an artist and his father an inn keeper. In 2007, Glanville graduated from University of California, Berkeley where he studied Genetics, Genomics, and Development in the Molecular and Cellular Biology program and conducted research in the Glenys Thomsom HLA population genetics laboratory and Kimmen Sjolander Berkeley Phylogenomics group. In 2008, he joined Pfizer and was promoted to staff scientist four years later. In 2012, Glanville founded Distributed Bio and became the first Computational and Systems Immunology Ph.D. candidate at Stanford University. He completed his doctorate in 2017. His doctoral advisors were Scott D. Boyd and Mark M. Davis. Glanville's dissertation was titled Reading the adaptive receptor repertoires. Microbiologist Sarah Ives is his research co-lead at Distributed Bio on the influenza project featured in Pandemic: How to Prevent an Outbreak.

References 

Jacob Glanville was interviewed on Checkpoint, Radio New Zealand 31 March 2020

External links
 

Living people
Year of birth missing (living people)
Place of birth missing (living people)
University of California, Berkeley alumni
Stanford University alumni
Guatemalan people of American descent
Scientific computing researchers
21st-century American engineers
21st-century American scientists
American immunologists
21st-century American businesspeople
American chief executives
American company founders
Guatemalan scientists
Guatemalan engineers
Guatemalan businesspeople
American medical researchers

People from The Dalles, Oregon